The Sydney Olympic Park Aquatic Centre (SOPAC) , formerly Sydney International Aquatic Centre (SIAC), is a swimming venue located in the Sydney Olympic Park in Sydney, New South Wales, Australia. Built in 1994, the SOPAC was a major venue for the 2000 Summer Olympics as it hosted the swimming, diving, synchronized swimming, the medal events for water polo, and the swimming portion of the modern pentathlon competitions. The SOPAC has since been a host venue for numerous schools and swimming associations around New South Wales. Currently, it has most notably been the venue for the annual CAS Swimming Championships. It is also scheduled to be the site of the 2022 Duel in the Pool. The SOPAC also includes a swim shop at the entry of the arena, a play area, a health club and operates swimming classes for all ages.

The arena currently holds 10,000 people. Capacity was boosted to 17,000 during the 2000 Summer Olympics.

2013 fire
In October 2013, a large blaze ripped through the centre's carpark, destroying more than 40 cars, one motorcycle and forcing 1,500 people to evacuate.

Gallery

See also

 2000 Summer Olympics venues
 List of sports venues in Australia

References

External links

Sydney Olympic Park Aquatic Centre

SOPAC Swimming Club

Olympic swimming venues
Sports venues in Sydney
Sports venues completed in 1994
Swimming venues in Australia
Venues of the 2000 Summer Olympics
Olympic diving venues
Olympic modern pentathlon venues
Olympic synchronized swimming venues
Olympic water polo venues
1994 establishments in Australia
Philip Cox buildings
Aquatic
Water polo venues in Australia